Margery Louise Allingham (20 May 1904 – 30 June 1966) was an English novelist from the "Golden Age of Detective Fiction", and considered one of its four "Queens of Crime", alongside Agatha Christie, Dorothy L. Sayers and Ngaio Marsh. 

Allingham is best remembered for her hero, the gentleman sleuth Albert Campion. Initially believed to be a parody of Dorothy L. Sayers's detective Lord Peter Wimsey, Campion matured into a strongly individual character, part-detective, part-adventurer, who formed the basis for 18 novels and many short stories.

Life and career

Childhood and schooling
Margery Louise Allingham was born on 20 May 1904 in Ealing, London, the eldest daughter of Herbert John (1868-1936) and Emily Jane ( Hughes; 1879-1960). She had a younger brother Philip William, and a younger sister Emily Joyce Allingham. Her family was immersed in literature; her parents were both writers. Her father was editor of the Christian Globe and The New London Journal, to which Margery later contributed articles and Sexton Blake stories, and he had become a successful pulp fiction writer, and her mother, as Emmie Allingham, was a contributor of stories to women's magazines. Soon after Margery's birth the family left London for Essex, where they lived in an old house in Layer Breton, a village near Colchester. She attended a local school and then the Perse School for Girls in Cambridge, all the while writing stories and plays. She earned her first fee at the age of eight, for a story printed in her aunt's magazine.

Upon returning to London in 1920 she studied drama and speech training at Regent Street Polytechnic, which helped her manage a stammer which she had  since childhood. At this time she first met her future husband, Philip Youngman Carter, whom she married in 1927. He collaborated with her and designed the jackets for many of her books. They lived on the edge of the Essex Marshes in Tolleshunt D'Arcy, near Maldon.

Early writings
While she was enrolled at the Regent Street Polytechnic she wrote a verse play, Dido and Aeneas, which was performed at St. George's Hall, London, and the Cripplegate Theatre, London. Allingham played the role of Dido and the scenery was designed by Philip Youngman Carter.

Her first novel, Blackkerchief Dick, was published in 1923, when she was 19. It was allegedly based on a story she had heard during a séance, though later in life this was debunked by her husband. Nevertheless, Allingham continued to include occult themes in many of her novels. Blackkerchief Dick was well received, but was not a financial success. She wrote several plays in this period and attempted to write a serious novel, but finding that her themes clashed with her natural light-heartedness, she decided instead to try the mystery genre.

Campion and success
Her breakthrough occurred in 1929 with the publication of The Crime at Black Dudley. This introduced Albert Campion, initially as a minor character, thought to be a parody of Dorothy Sayers’s Lord Peter Wimsey. Campion returned in Mystery Mile, thanks in part to pressure from her American publishers, who had been taken with the character.

With a strong central character and a format to work in, she began to produce a series of Campion novels. At first she also continued writing short stories and articles for magazines such as The Strand Magazine, but as her Campion saga went on her sales grew steadily. Campion proved so successful that Allingham made him the centrepiece of another 17 novels and more than 20 short stories, continuing into the 1960s. 

Campion is a mysterious upper-class character (early novels hint that his family is in the line of succession to the throne), working under an assumed name. He floats between the upper echelons of the nobility and government on the one hand, and the shady world of the criminal class on the other, often accompanied by his scurrilous ex-burglar servant Magersfontein Lugg. During the course of his career Campion is sometimes a detective, sometimes an adventurer.

The first three Campion novels, The Crime at Black Dudley, Mystery Mile and Look to the Lady, were all written by what Allingham referred to as the "plum pudding" method, focused less on methods of murder or the formal strictures of the whodunit and more on mixing possibilities together. As the series progresses, however, Campion comes to work more closely with the police and MI6 counter-intelligence. He also falls in love, gets married and has a child, and as time goes by he grows in wisdom and matures emotionally.

The style and format of the books moved on: while the early novels are light-hearted whodunnits or "fantastical" adventures, The Tiger in the Smoke (1952) is more a character study than a crime novel, focusing on the serial killer Jack Havoc. In many of the later books Campion plays a subsidiary role, no more prominent than the roles of his wife Amanda and his police associates, and in the last novel he is a minor character.

In 1941 Allingham published a non-fiction work, The Oaken Heart, which describes her experiences in Essex when an invasion from Germany was expected and actively being planned for, potentially placing the civilian population of Essex in the front line.

Death
Allingham suffered from breast cancer and died at Severalls Hospital, Colchester, England, on 30 June 1966, aged 62. Her final Campion novel, Cargo of Eagles, was completed by her husband at her request, and was published in 1968.

Compilations of her work, both with and without Albert Campion, continued to be released through the 1970s. The Margery Allingham Omnibus, comprising Sweet Danger, The Case of the Late Pig and The Tiger in the Smoke, with a critical introduction by Jane Stevenson, was published in 2006.

Allingham was buried in the newer cemetery in Tolleshunt D'Arcy, which is across the road from the graveyard of St Nicholas's Church and about half a mile to the south.

Legacy
A film version of Tiger in the Smoke was made in 1956 and a highly popular series of Campion adaptations, now available on DVD, was shown by the BBC in 1989–90. It is titled simply Campion and stars Peter Davison as Campion and Brian Glover as Lugg.

Several books have been written about Allingham and her work, including:
 Margery Allingham: 100 Years of a Great Mystery Writer edited by Marianne van Hoeven (2003)
 Margery Allingham: A Biography by Julia Thorogood (1991); revised as The Adventures of Margery Allingham as by Julia Jones (2009). 
 Ink in Her Blood: The Life and Crime Fiction of Margery Allingham by Richard Martin (1988)
 Campion's Career: A Study of the Novels of Margery Allingham by B.A. Pike (1987)

Further Campion adventures have been written by Mike Ripley. The first of these, Mr Campion's Farewell, was based on notes left at his death by Allingham's husband Philip Youngman Carter; all the rest have been originals.

Bibliography

Albert Campion novels and short stories

Short stories and novellas

Non-fiction
Is Golf a Menace to Marriage?
The Public Spirit of Francis Smith

Radio plays
A Corner in Crime
Room to Let (1947) (filmed in 1950)

Stage plays
Water in a Sieve

Other works by Margery Allingham
 Blackkerchief Dick (1923)
 The White Cottage Mystery (1928)
 The Darings of the Red Rose (1930) Published anonymously in the Weekly Welcome magazine
 Black Plumes (1940)
 The Oaken Heart (1941: autobiographical)
 Dance of the Years (1943: also known as The Galantrys)
 Wanted: Someone Innocent (1946: novella and short stories)
Wanted: Someone Innocent 
He Was Asking After You 
The Sexton's Wife 
'Tis Not Hereafter
 Deadly Duo (1949: UK title Take Two at Bedtime (1950)) – two novellas:
 Wanted: Someone Innocent
 Last Act
 Take Two at Bedtime (1950) (novellas)
Last Act 
Wanted: Someone Innocent
 No Love Lost (1954) (novellas)
 The Patient at Peacocks Hall 
 Safer Than Love 
 The Allingham Case-Book (1969: short stories)
"Black Plumes" (some re-prints)
"The Border-Line Case" (Mr. Campion)
"Evidence in Camera"
"Face Value"
"Is There a Doctor in the House?"
"Joke Over" (Mr. Campion)
"The Lieabout"
"Little Miss Know-All" (Mr. Campion)
"The Lying-in-State"
"The Mind's Eye Mystery"
"Mum Knows Best" (Mr. Campion)
"One Morning They'll Hang Him" (Mr. Campion)
"The Pioneers"
"The Pro and the Con" (Mr. Campion)
"The Psychologist"
"The Snapdragon and the C.I.D." (Mr. Campion)
"Tall Story" (Mr. Campion)
"They Never Get Caught"
"Three Is a Lucky Number"
"The Villa Marie Celeste" (Mr. Campion)
 The Darings of the Red Rose (Crippen & Landru, 1995)
 Three is a Lucky Number

As Maxwell March (a pseudonym)
 Other Man's Danger (1933: US title The Man of Dangerous Secrets) 
 Rogues' Holiday (1935) 
 The Shadow in the House (1936: US title The Devil and Her Son)

References

Further reading
 CLUES: A Journal of Detection 23.1 (Fall 2004). Ed. Margaret Kinsman. Theme issue on Margery Allingham.
 Joshi, S. T. "Margery Allingham: Murder, Gangs and Spies." In Varieties of Crime Fiction (Wildside Press, 2019) .
 Pike, B. A. "The Short Stories of Margery Allingham."  CLUES: A Journal of Detection 25.4 (Summer 2007): 27–36.

External links

 The Margery Allingham Society
 A brief biography and analysis from ClassicCrimeFiction.com
 

1904 births
1966 deaths
Alumni of the Regent Street Polytechnic
English crime fiction writers
English mystery writers
Members of the Detection Club
Deaths from breast cancer
Deaths from cancer in England
People educated at the Perse School for Girls
Women mystery writers
English women novelists
20th-century English women writers
20th-century English novelists
People from Ealing
People from Maldon District